Aliphine Chepkerker Tuliamuk (born 5 April 1989) is a Kenyan-born American long-distance runner. She placed first at the 2020 Olympic Marathon trials in Atlanta and represented the United States at the 2021 Olympic Games in Tokyo, Japan. Tuliamuk has been a world class athlete since placing 9th in 21:09 at 2005 IAAF World Cross Country Championships – Junior women's race. Tuliamuk ran 33:43 to place 15th at 2017 IAAF World Cross Country Championships. Tuliamuk placed 3rd at 2019 Rotterdam Marathon in 2:26:50.

NCAA
In college, Tuliamuk was an All-American at Wichita State University.  Tuliamuk became a First Team NCAA Division I All-American in cross country and in 2013, the first woman from her village to graduate from college, with a major in Public Health.

Professional
In 2013, Tuliamuk set a course record at the Santa Fe Thunder half marathon, with a time of 1:09:16.

In 2016, she won the Fifth Third River Bank Run (functioning as the US 25 km championships) defeating Lindsey Scherf, Clara Santucci, Dorothy McMahan, Gladys Kipsoi, and Chirine Njeim.

She also won the 2016 US 20 km championships defeating Emily Sisson, Brianne Nelson, Lindsey Scherf, Sarah Crouch, and Tara Welling.

For her third national title of the year, she won the 2016 US 5 km championships defeating Emily Sisson, Jordan Hasay, Laura Thweatt, Lindsey Scherf, and Jennifer Rhines.

In 2017, Tuliamuk won 2017 USA Cross Country Championships title defeating Laura Thweatt, Kellyn Taylor, Courtney Frerichs, Sarah Pagano, and Elaina Balouris. Tuliamuk placed 15th at 2017 IAAF World Cross Country Championships – Senior women's race ran 33:43 over 10,000 meters.

References

External links

 
 
 NAZ Elite Host Eric Senseman talks with Aliphine Tuliamuk about her transition to joining Northern Arizona Elite, her 9 US National Championships
 Midday Treat with NAZ Elite - Episode 25 - Join host Eric Senseman as he talks with Aliphine Tuliamuk after her third place finish at the 2019 Rotterdam Marathon. HOKA NAZ Elite
 

1989 births
Living people
Track and field athletes from New Mexico
People from Rift Valley Province
American female long-distance runners
American female cross country runners
American female marathon runners
Kenyan female long-distance runners
Kenyan female cross country runners
Kenyan female marathon runners
Wichita State Shockers women's cross country runners
Wichita State Shockers women's track and field athletes
Athletes (track and field) at the 2020 Summer Olympics
Olympic track and field athletes of the United States
21st-century American women